David Wills (born October 23, 1951, in Pulaski, Tennessee) is an American country music singer-songwriter. Wills released three studio albums and charted more than twenty singles on the Billboard Hot Country Singles chart between 1975 and 1988. Two of his songs, "There's a Song on the Jukebox" and "From Barrooms to Bedrooms," reached the Top 10 in 1975. Wills was a BMI songwriter for Pride Music Group, along with Blake Mevis and Bob Moulds. David was married to Deborah Ann Smith (from Dallas, TX) who owned Alcorn Music, Inc. publishing company.

As a songwriter, Wills wrote George Strait's "If You're Thinking You Want a Stranger (There's One Coming Home)" and Garth Brooks' "Wild Horses."

Discography

Albums

Singles

References

External links
[ David Wills] at Allmusic

1951 births
American country singer-songwriters
American male singer-songwriters
Living people
People from Pulaski, Tennessee
Singer-songwriters from Tennessee
Country musicians from Tennessee